Michael Dacher (21 August 1933 – 3 December 1994) was a German mountaineer and extreme climber.  In 1979 he and Reinhold Messner climbed the K2 in record time and without oxygen equipment.

A primary school in Khadambas, a village 80 km east of Kathmandu in Nepal, has been named after him.

Dacher was born in Peiting.

Climbs

Europe 

 1950 Geiselstein in the Ammer Mountains
 1951 Geiselstein south face, south cut, east cut, first five-day tour
 1952 Fleischbank, southeast face, Bauernpredigtstuhl-Alte Westwand
 1953 Fleischbank-Südostverschneidung, Mauk, west face (Buhlroute), Schüsselkarspitze, southeast face, Große Zinne-Norwand (Comici)
 1954 Predigtstuhl – direct west face (4th ascent) Große Zinne, north face (Comici), 4th solo ascent
 1955 Torre di Valgrande, northwest face (Carlessoführe), many solo tours in local Ammer Mountains
 1956/57 first West Alpine journey, Westliche Zinne, north face (Cassin)
 1959 Piz Badile, northeast face
 1960 , southwest face (Brandler-Hasse)
 1961 Große Zinne, direct north face
 1962 Grandes Jorasses-Walkerpfeiler, first ice tour
 1963 Ortler, north face (Schmid)
 1964 Matterhorn, north face
 1965/68 Oberreintaldom-Gondaverschneidung und Schießlerführe, Berggeisttum-Cukrowskiführe, Montblanc-Brenvaflanke, Blatière, west face (Brown), Sass-Maor, east face (Solleder), Piz de Ciavàzes-south face (Schubert)
 1969 Eiger, north face (Heckmair), Mont Maudit southeast arête
 1971/72 Trollryggen, northeast face (Norway)
 1974 Cengalo, northwest pillar
 1976 , southwest face (Eisenstecken)
 1978 Triolet, north face, Grubenkarspitze, west face (Klaus Werner Führe) Karwendel

Asia 

 1973 Hindu Kush expedition, failed owing to equipment losses
 1975 Yalung Kang (8,438 m) (Kangchenjunga West Peak), second ascent
 1977 Lhotse (8,516 m) im Khumbu Himalayas, without supplemental oxygen
 1979 K2 (8,611 m) im Karakoram with Reinhold Messner; Dacher was the first German on the K2
 1980 Shishapangma (8,046 m) in Tibet
 1981 Nanga Parbat (8,125 m) in Pakistan
 1982 Hidden Peak (8,080 m), first ascent of a variation in the north face
 1983 Cho Oyu (8,188 m) from the southwest in Alpine style
 1984 Manaslu (8,163 m)
 1985 Dhaulagiri (8,167 m), failed owing to sickness of a colleague
 1986 Broad Peak (8,047 m)
 1987 Everest (8,848 m), failed owing to storms
 1987 Gasherbrum II (8,035 m)
 1988 Makalu (8,485 m) failed owing to hurricane winds 
 1990 Dhaulagiri (8,167 m) international expedition, failed
 1991 Everest (8,848 m) attempt
 1993 Mustagh Ata (7,546 m) climbed with skis
 1993 Everest (8,848 m), expedition attempt

South America 

 1992 Aconcagua (6,962 m), Dacher is expedition leader

Greenland 
 1970 Greenland, inland ice crossing from west to east (Nansen route) with Franz Martin

References

1933 births
1994 deaths
German mountain climbers